A mill pond is any body of water used as a reservoir for a water-powered mill. 

Mill Pond may also refer to:

Places in the United States
Mill Pond (Barnstable, Massachusetts), source of the Bass River
Mill Pond (Duxbury, Massachusetts)
Mill Pond (Littleton, Massachusetts), in Littleton, Massachusetts
Mill Pond (Wareham, Massachusetts)
Mill Pond (Grandin, Missouri), listed on the National Register of Historic Places

Other uses
Mill Pond (Milton, Ontario)
The Mill Pond, a 1997 EP by John Fahey

See also
Waddells Mill Pond Site, an archaeological site located seven miles northwest of Marianna, Florida
Sloat's Dam and Mill Pond, a dam and mill pond between Waldron Terrace and Ballard Avenue in Sloatsburg, New York
Cooksville Mill and Mill Pond Site, Evansville, Wisconsin, listed on the NRHP in Wisconsin